Leandro Matías Martínez Montagnoli (born April 21, 1987 in Buenos Aires, Argentina) is a professional Argentine footballer who currently plays for Defensores de Belgrano.

References

External links
 

1987 births
Living people
Argentine footballers
Argentine expatriate footballers
Association football defenders
Defensores de Belgrano footballers
Ferro Carril Oeste footballers
Estudiantes de Buenos Aires footballers
Club Atlético Atlanta footballers
Club Atlético Colegiales (Argentina) players
Tampico Madero F.C. footballers
Primera Nacional players
Primera B Metropolitana players
Ascenso MX players
Argentine expatriate sportspeople in Mexico
Expatriate footballers in Mexico
Footballers from Buenos Aires